Edward Vaughan was a Welsh Anglican priest in the 17th century.

Owen was born in Caer Gai and educated at Jesus College, Oxford, graduating BA from 1638. Upchurch, Llanynys, Llangar, co. Merioneth,Llanarmon and Mallwyd. He was archdeacon of Cardigan from 1560 to 1563.

References

People from Merionethshire
Alumni of Jesus College, Oxford
Archdeacons of Cardigan
1680 deaths
Year of birth missing